The Walters Shoals is a group of submerged mountains off the coast of Madagascar. The Walters Shoals is home to many species of fish, crustaceans, and mollusks.
It was discovered in 1963 by the South African Hydrographic Frigate SAS Natal captained by Cmdr Walters. When found it had a huge population of Galápagos sharks but they have since been fished out.

References

Indian Ocean 
Seamounts of the Indian Ocean
Landforms of Madagascar
Former islands from the last glacial maximum